Mish Barber-Way (born 15 July 1985) is a Canadian singer, songwriter and writer. She founded punk band White Lung in 2006 and served as its vocalist until the band's breakup in 2022.

Early life
Barber-Way was born on 15 July 1985 in Vancouver, British Columbia. As a child, she competed in figure skating before focusing on music and writing. In university, Barber-Way originally studied writing before switching to programs in philosophy and gender studies. During her post-secondary education, she worked as an intern for Vancouver Magazine and Hearty. During her teens, she worked as a dry cleaner.

Career
Barber-Way started playing music in her former boyfriend's band before co-forming White Lung in 2006. After the release of White Lung's second studio album Sorry, Barber-Way considered leaving the band to concentrate on her writing career, but ultimately decided to stay after Sorry grew in popularity and the band was given a record contract with Domino. While singing in White Lung, Barber-Way wrote articles for various media sources including Vice Media, Talkhouse, Hustler, The Guardian, i-D, Dazed, Los Angeles Times, V, among others. She is also the executive editor at Penthouse, as well as the music editor for BriteLite magazine. In 2015, Anna Wintour let Barber-Way model Yves Saint Laurent in Vogues September issue, shot by David Sims. In 2016, Barber-Way performed a cover of "Used to Love Her" by Guns N' Roses. In 2021, she sang on The Bloody Beetroots's song "Radium Girls".

Personal life
Barber-Way is married to singer Austin Barber of American rock band Saviours, and they live in the suburbs of Los Angeles, California with their children. In prior albums with White Lung, Barber-Way incorporated songs about her personal experience with body dysmorphia and addiction.

References

External links

Living people
Canadian punk rock singers
21st-century Canadian women singers
American magazine editors
Women magazine editors
1985 births
Women punk rock singers